The 12371 / 12372 Howrah–Jaisalmer Superfast Express is a Superfast Express train of the Indian Railways connecting  in West Bengal and  of Rajasthan. It is currently being operated with 12371/12372 train numbers on a weekly basis.

Service

The 12371/Howrah–Jaisalmer Superfast Express has an average speed of 57 km/h and covers 2249 km in 39 hrs 25 mins. 12372/Jaisalmer–Howrah Superfast Express has an average speed of 57 km/hr and covers 2249 km in 39 hrs 25 mins.

Route & halts

The important halts of the train are:

 
 
 
 
 
 
 
 
 
 
 
 
 
 
 
 
 
 
 Sultanpur Jn

Coach composition

The train has got LHB rakes from 26 August 2019, with max speed of 130 km/h. The train consists of 24 coaches:

 1 First AC
 1 AC II Tier
 4 AC III Tier
 11 Sleeper coaches
 3 General
 2 Second-class Luggage/parcel van
 1 High capacity parcel van
 1 Pantry car

Traction

See also 

 Howrah Junction railway station
 Jaisalmer railway station

Timetable  

12371 – Starts from Howrah every Monday at 8:15 AM and reaches Jaisalmer next day at night 11:50 PM IST
12372 – Starts from Jaisalmer every Thursday at afternoon 1:25 AM IST and reaches Howrah next day evening 4:55 PM

Notes

References

External links 
12371/Howrah - Jaisalmer SF Express India Rail Info
12372/Jaisalmer - Howrah SF Express India Rail Info
Train info

Rail transport in Howrah
Transport in Jaisalmer
Express trains in India
Rail transport in West Bengal
Rail transport in Jharkhand
Rail transport in Bihar
Rail transport in Uttar Pradesh
Rail transport in Delhi
Rail transport in Haryana
Rail transport in Rajasthan
Railway services introduced in 2012